Anatoliy Petrovych Bezsmertnyi (born 21 January 1969) is a Ukrainian professional football coach and a former player.

Career
Bezsmertnyi started to play football at the Dynamo sports school of Olympic Reserve and his first coach was Volodymyr Onyshchenko.

He made his professional debut in the Soviet Second League in 1987 for SC Tavriya Simferopol. In 1988 he was drafted to military service and spent couple of seasons playing for a sports company of SKA Lvov in competitions for armed forces and later at professional level for its descendant Halychyna Drohobych.

After his military service, Bezsmertnyi spent a season in neighboring Zakarpattia playing for a Mukachevo team. At the end of 1991 with a help of the Zakarpattia native and Dynamo's veteran Mykhailo Koman, he returned to Dynamo Kyiv.

While being a manager of Dnipro Cherkasy, in 2008-09 Bezsmertnyi played couple of seasons at the national Amateur League for a veteran team Irpin Horenychi from Kyiv suburbs. He won the 2008 Ukrainian Amateur Cup with club in 2008 by beating in finals Halychyna Lviv.

As part of the FC Poltava coaching staff, at age 45 Bezsmertnyi also played a match for another Kyivan veteran team "Yevrobis-Ahrobiznes" that in 2014 Ukrainian Amateur Cup played only one game against ODEK Orzhiv at the CSK ZSU Stadium.

Honours
 Ukrainian Premier League champion: 1993.
 Ukrainian Premier League runner-up: 1992.
 Ukrainian Amateur Cup holder: 2008.
 Russian Second Division Zone South best defender: 2004.

European club competitions
 1991–92 European Cup with FC Dynamo Kyiv: 2 games.
 1999 UEFA Intertoto Cup with FC Rostselmash Rostov-on-Don: 5 games.

References

1969 births
Living people
Footballers from Kyiv
Soviet footballers
Ukrainian footballers
Association football midfielders
Association football defenders
Ukrainian expatriate footballers
Ukrainian Premier League players
Russian Premier League players
SC Tavriya Simferopol players
FC Halychyna Drohobych players
FC Karpaty Mukacheve players
FC Dynamo Kyiv players
FC Dynamo-2 Kyiv players
FC Tyumen players
FC Rostov players
FC Chernomorets Novorossiysk players
FC Dynamo Stavropol players
FC Dnipro Cherkasy players
FC Irpin Horenychi players
Expatriate footballers in Russia
Ukrainian football managers
Ukrainian Premier League managers
Ukrainian First League managers
Ukrainian Second League managers
FC Dnipro Cherkasy managers
FC Poltava managers
PFC Sumy managers
FC Polissya Zhytomyr managers
FC Lviv managers
FC Viktoriya Mykolaivka managers
FC Alians Lypova Dolyna managers